Alphonsa College, Pala, is a women's degree college located in Pala, Kottayam district, Kerala. It was established in 1964. The college is affiliated with Mahatma Gandhi University. This college offers different courses in arts, commerce and science.

Departments

Science
Physics
Chemistry
Mathematics
Botany
Statistics
Zoology
Computer Science
Clinical Nutrition & Dietetics

Arts and Commerce
Malayalam
English
Hindi
History
Political Science
Economics
Fashion Technology
Physical Education
Commerce

Accreditation
The college is recognized by the University Grants Commission (UGC).

References

External links

List of colleges affiliated with Mahatma Gandhi University, Kerala#Art and Sciences

Universities and colleges in Kottayam district
Educational institutions established in 1964
1964 establishments in Kerala
Arts and Science colleges in Kerala
Colleges affiliated to Mahatma Gandhi University, Kerala
Education in Pala, Kerala